Novera Ahmed (29 March 1939 – 6 May 2015) was a modern sculptor of Bangladesh. She was awarded Ekushey Padak by the Government of Bangladesh in 1997. Artist Zainul Abedin described her work saying "What Novera is doing now will take us a long time to understand – she is that kind of an artist."

Early life and education
Ahmed was born on 29 March 1939, in Sundarbans in the then Bengal Presidency, British India. Her ancestral home was in Chittagong. She studied in Calcutta and Comilla. In 1955 she was awarded a diploma in Design in the Modeling and Sculpture course from Camberwell College of Arts in London. At Camberwell, she studied under the British sculptor Jacob Epstein and Karel Vogel of Czechoslovakia. In 1966, she met Danish artist Asger Jorn in Paris. She studied European sculpture under the sculptor Venturino Venturi in Florence and later in Vienna. She was influenced by many western modern sculptors such as Henry Moore.

Career
Ahmed jointly worked with Hamidur Rahman on the original design of the Shaheed Minar, Dhaka. During 1956–1960, she had done about 100 sculptures in Dhaka. Out of her 100 sculptures, 33 sculptures are currently in Bangladesh National Museum. Ahmed's first exhibition was held in University of Dhaka in 1960. Another exhibition of her works was held in Lahore in 1961. Her last exhibition was also held in Paris in July 1973.

Style and technique
Ahmed's early works resembled geometrical forms made by stones and concrete and anthropomorphic forms - mixing the human figure and animals. Then she used iron and steel and later bronze. She began spray paintings, using plane crash remains from the US army (1964–1969). After her bad accident, her drawings included shapes and figures of a meditative character: space, island, birds in the sky, phoenix, flowers, water, sunshine and the moon, minimalist landscapes, human figures turned toward a new horizon and others.

Personal life
Ahmed was married to a police officer in mid 1954 in Calcutta. The couple got divorced in late 1954. She started living in France in the 1970s. She married Gregoire de Brouhns in 1984.

Death and legacy
Ahmed suffered a stroke in 2010 and she was in a wheelchair since then. She died on 6 May 2015 at a hospital in Paris, France. In August 2017, the ministry of cultural affairs of the Government of Bangladesh announced a plan to purchase ten paintings of Ahmed for $47,000.

On 29 March 2019, search engine Google commemorated Ahmed with a Doodle on her 80th birth anniversary.

Selected works

References

Further reading
 

1939 births
2015 deaths
People from Chittagong
Alumni of Camberwell College of Arts
Modern sculptors
Bangladeshi women sculptors
Bangladeshi women artists
Artists from Chittagong
Bengali women artists
20th-century Bangladeshi sculptors
20th-century Indian sculptors
20th-century women artists
Recipients of the Ekushey Padak
20th-century Indian women